"Como Te Quiero Yo a Ti" ("How I Love You") is a song by American singer Selena, originally from her fourth indie release, Preciosa (1988). It was released as a single on Momentos Intimos (2004) and Moonchild Mixes (2022). Written by Ricky Vela, the song debuted and peaked at number six on the US Billboard Latin Digital Song Sales chart following its release from Moonchild Mixes.

Chart performance

References

Works cited

External links 
 

 
2004 singles
2022 singles
Spanish-language songs
Selena songs
Songs written by Ricky Vela
Song recordings produced by A. B. Quintanilla
Mariachi
1980s ballads
EMI Latin singles
Warner Music Latina singles